Andrew Cameron, QPM, is the former Chief Constable, Central Scotland Police.

He joined the police as a cadet at the age of 15. As a police-sponsored student, he graduated with a BA in Business Administration from the University of Strathclyde in 1983. He rose to be the Chief Constable of Central Scotland Police (2000-2008) and served as president of the Association of Chief Police Officers Scotland.

He was appointed a CBE for services to the police in the New Year Honours 2008.

In 2008, he was awarded Alumnus of the Year by the University of Strathclyde.

References

Year of birth missing (living people)
Living people
Officers in Scottish police forces
Scottish police officers
Scottish recipients of the Queen's Police Medal